The following is a list of films produced in the Kannada film industry in India in 2006, presented in alphabetical order.

List of released films in 2006

January–June

July – December

References

External links
 Kannada Movies of 2006 at the Internet Movie Database

2006
Lists of 2006 films by country or language
Kannada films